Dorgali is a comune (municipality) in the Province of Nuoro in the Italian region Sardinia, located about  northeast of Cagliari and about  east of Nuoro in the Seaside Supramonte mountain area.

Economy is mostly based on the vine and wine production and, in summertime, on tourism.

In one of the caves, Ispinigoli, the only known specimen of the extinct giant otter Megalenhydris was found.

It is the birthplace of blessed Maria Gabriella Sagheddu.

Main sights
Nuraghe villages of Tiscali and Serra Orrios
Other prehistoric nuraghes, dolmens, menhirs and Domus de janas
Giants' grave of S'Ena'e Thomes
Motorra Dolmen
Beach of Cala Gonone
Grotta del Bue Marino
Ispinigoli Cave
Tiscali Cave

References

External links

 Official website
 Dorgali in the Gulf of Orosei

Cities and towns in Sardinia